Allison Kugel  is an American public relations professional and entrepreneur. In 2001, Kugel founded two online enterprises that led to her being featured in Entrepreneur Magazine in 2004.

Kugel was laid off after 9/11. She was inspired to become an entrepreneur after reading an Internet start-up book owned by her 15-year-old brother.

Kugel launched TireSignal.com after her father showed her a clever but then-unpopular tire cap with a pressure indicator he'd received as a sample. TireSignal.com sold a similar product that Kugel's cousin had developed.

References 

Living people
American public relations people
American women journalists
Writers from New York (state)
Year of birth missing (living people)
21st-century American women